The Aruba Natural Bridge was a tourist attraction in Arikok National Park, Aruba that was formed naturally out of coral limestone. It collapsed on 2 September 2005.

References

External links

Caves of Aruba
Caves of the Caribbean
Landforms of Aruba
Natural arches
Tourist attractions in Aruba
Collapsed arches